Polyptychoides politzari is a moth of the  family Sphingidae. It is known from the Meru Forest in Kenya.

References

Polyptychoides
Moths described in 2005